Avenging Spider-Man is the title of an American comic book series published monthly by Marvel Comics, featuring the adventures of the fictional superhero Spider-Man. The events in the story take place in the primary continuity of the mainstream Marvel Universe along with the events of The Amazing Spider-Man and later The Superior Spider-Man. This was the first ongoing series to feature Spider-Man as the main character besides The Amazing Spider-Man since the cancellation of Friendly Neighborhood Spider-Man and the second volume of Sensational Spider-Man in December 2008 following the conclusion of the "One More Day" storyline. Avenging Spider-Man has also been instrumental in Marvel's shift towards including codes to receive free digital copies of the comic with purchased print comic books.

Format
The format of the series was very similar to the Marvel Team-Up comic book where Spider-Man teams up with another character in every issue. The first and second volumes of Marvel Team-Up primarily (but not exclusively) featured Spider-Man whereas Avenging Spider-Man exclusively features Spider-Man.

Publication history
Marvel announced the publication in June 2011. The first issue was released 9 November 2011, with Zeb Wells as the writer, Joe Madureira as the penciller, and Ferran Daniel as the colorist. The first issue outsold both issues of The Amazing Spider-Man released in November and was the sixth best selling comic book of the month.

The first three issues of the series contained a code for a free digital copy of the comic book, which is the first time any publisher has provided free digital copies as part of the print copy of the comic book. The free digital copy with purchase was extended to include the fourth issue, but Marvel changed from using a sealed poly-bag to protect the code to using a sticker so potential readers could look at the book before purchasing. The response to the free digital code in the first issue was so positive that Marvel announced they would include free digital codes in comic books in their Ultimate line of comics starting in January 2012. The free digital copy with purchase, still using the sticker to protect the code, was extended to the fifth, sixth, and seventh issues before all Marvel comics priced at $3.99 started receiving free digital codes in June 2012 (issue eight) due to the success of the free digital codes in Avenging Spider-Man and the Ultimate line of comics.

It was announced in April 2013 that Avenging Spider-Man was to end in July of the same year, with Superior Spider-Man Team-Up taking its place. It would retain the creative team of writer Christopher Yost and artists Paolo Rivera and Marco Checchetto.

Issues

Collected editions

References

External links
Marvel.com "3 Ways to Buy" information

Spider-Man titles
2011 comics debuts
Team-up comics